is a Japanese curler from Karuizawa, Nagano. He competed at the 2015 Ford World Men's Curling Championship in Halifax, Nova Scotia, Canada, as lead for the Japanese team, which placed sixth in the tournament.

Personal life
Morozumi is employed as sales clerk for a leisure store.

References

External links

1988 births
Living people
Japanese male curlers
Sportspeople from Nagano Prefecture
Asian Games medalists in curling
Curlers at the 2017 Asian Winter Games
Medalists at the 2017 Asian Winter Games
Asian Games silver medalists for Japan
Curlers at the 2018 Winter Olympics
Olympic curlers of Japan
Pacific-Asian curling champions
21st-century Japanese people